Peter Borgelt (20 September 1927 – 18 March 1994) was a German television actor.

Borgelt was best known for playing the character of Hauptmann Fuchs in the long-running series Polizeiruf 110 between 1971 and 1991. As with this series he often played detectives.

Filmography
The Adventures of Werner Holt (1965)
Die Toten bleiben jung (1968), as Triebel
Nebelnacht (1969)
Drei von der K (1 episode, 1969), as Herr Klapper
Sudba rezidenta (1970), as Police Commissar
Verspielte Heimat (1971), as Herbert Bendlin
Polizeiruf 110 (84 episodes, 1971–1991), as Hauptmann Fuchs
Herbstzeit (1979, TV), as Oberleutnant Peter Fuchs
Die lieben Luder (1983, TV), as Hauptmann Peter Fuchs
Familie Neumann (1984, TV Series)
Ferienheim Bergkristall (1 episode, 1985), as Ehrengast
Die Wildschweinjagd (1987, TV)
Spreepiraten (1989, TV Series), as Eddi der Eisbrecher
Tatort (1 episode, 1990), as Kriminalhauptkommissar Peter Fuchs
Drei reizende Schwestern (1 episode, 1991)

External links 
 

1927 births
1994 deaths
German male television actors
People from Rostock
Deaths from cancer in Germany
20th-century German male actors